Vladimir Ilyich Gendlin (26 May 1936 – 5 April 2021) was a Russian commentator and boxing expert, a two-time TEFI award winner. He was the founder of professional boxing telecasts on Russian television. Gendlin's program Bolshoi Ring was considered the best program about boxing in the world by the World Boxing Union in 1995.

He enjoyed prestige in leading magazines, the boxing community in Russia, and countries of the Commonwealth of Independent States.

Biography
Gendlin was born in Moscow. He studied maths at Saratov University but left after the fourth year. He was a master of the sport of boxing, with 51 amateur fights, resulting in 50 victories and one loss. After retirement he worked as a children's trainer at the Olympic base in Kislovodsk. Gendlin was the president of the club Red Stars. After that he became the general manager of the Union of boxers of Russia. Then he worked as a journalist in magazines, and on television in Volgograd and Pyatigorsk. In the early 1990s Gendlin founded the TV programme Bolshoi Ring which was awarded the title of best boxing programme by WBU in 1995. Gendlin was the main commentator for NTV, NTV Plus and Channel One (Russia). He created documentaries about Sergei Kobozev, Sergey Artemiev, Kostya Tszyu, Oleg Maskaev and others. Gendlin was not a fan of women's boxing.

Death
Gendlin died in Moscow on 5 April 2021. He had been experiencing serious health problems, suffering a massive heart attack in March. He subsequently contracted COVID-19, developing complications in the form of pneumonia.

Quotes

References

External links
Vladimir Gendlin's conference: Talking Style
Vladimir Gendlin at peoples.ru
Interview in Gordon's Boulevard, #3 (247) 2010-01-19
  Vladimir Gendlin, The Voice of Russian Boxing by Fighter TV
 Бокс — Владимир Гендлин

1936 births
2021 deaths
Mass media people from Moscow
Boxing commentators
Russian sports journalists
Soviet male boxers
Russian male boxers
Russian television presenters
Deaths from the COVID-19 pandemic in Russia
Sportspeople from Moscow